Patrick Andrew "Pat" Clohessy AM (born 16 May 1933) is an Australian runner and distance running coach.

Middle Distance Career
Clohessy grew up in Muswellbrook, New South Wales and Tamworth, New South Wales due to his father Patrick being the postmaster with Postmaster-General's Department in these rural towns. He took up running when he joined the Muswellbrook Athletics Club in 1953. He had early success in winning the 1954 New South Wales Country Championships 880 yards and one mile events in record time. He then moved to Sydney to run for Randwick Botany Athletics Club. Clohessy then moved to the United States to study and lecture at the University of Houston. He encouraged Australian middle distance runner Allan Lawrence to study at the University of Houston. Lawrence went on to win the 5000m at 1960 NCAA Championship.

Notable performances by Clohessy as an athlete included:
 Won the 3 Miles NCAA Championship whilst at the University of Houston in 1961 (Philadelphia in  13:47.7) and 1962 (Eugene in 13:51.6 )  
 Won the Amateur Athletic Union 3 miles in 1963.
 7th in the 3 Miles at the 1962 British Empire and Commonwealth Games
 3rd World Games in Helsinki in 1963.

Coaching career
After returning to Australia from the United States, Clohessy became a teacher and athletics coach at Xavier College in Melbourne. It was at Xavier College that Clohessy started to coach Robert de Castella, who would go on to win the marathon at the 1982 Commonwealth Games, 1986 Commonwealth Games and the 1983 World Championships in Athletics. In 1983, after 16 years at Xavier College, he was appointed distance running coach at the Australian Institute of Sport (AIS). It was a position he held until 1994 when he took up an Athletics Australia coaching position in Brisbane, Queensland.

In 1998, he took up a position as athletics coach at the University of Queensland.

Clohessy was an athletics coach on the 1980 and 1984 Australian Olympic teams and 1983 and 1987 World Championships teams.

Notable Australian and AIS athletes coached by Clohessy include: Robert de Castella, Krishna Stanton, Simon Doyle, Shaun Creighton, Susan Hobson, Pat Scammell, Matt Favier, Pat Carroll, Andrew Lloyd and Brittany McGowan.

In 1994, Susan Hobson edited the book - Pat Clohessy : athlete, coach, mentor published by the Australian Sports Commission.

Recognition
 1984 - Member of the inaugural Australian Sports Commission Board
 1988 - Member of the Order of Australia (AM) for his service to sport as a track and field coach.
 1997 - Life Membership of Athletics Australia
 1997 - Sport Australia Hall of Fame General Member 
 2000 - Australian Sports Medal
 2014 - Life Governor of Athletics Australia

References

External links
 
 Patrick 'Pat' Clohessy at Australian Athletics Historical Results

1933 births
Living people
Australian athletics coaches
Australian Institute of Sport coaches
Australian Olympic coaches
Recipients of the Medal of the Order of Australia
Sport Australia Hall of Fame inductees
Recipients of the Australian Sports Medal
Australian male middle-distance runners
University of Houston alumni
Sportsmen from New South Wales